Brian Derek Perry, OBE (born 11 March 1946) is a British veterinary surgeon and epidemiologist renowned for the integration of veterinary epidemiology and agricultural economics,  as a tool for disease control policy and strategy development, and specialised in international agricultural development. He is an Honorary Professor at the University of Edinburgh, a Visiting Professor at the Nuffield Department of Clinical Medicine, University of Oxford.

Early life and education
Brian Perry is from a farming family in Norfolk and was educated at Town Close School, Norwich and Wymondham College, Norfolk. He studied veterinary medicine at the Royal (Dick) School of Veterinary Medicine, University of Edinburgh and graduated as a veterinary surgeon in 1969. He later completed a Diploma in Tropical Veterinary Medicine (1971), an MSc in Tropical Veterinary Science (1975), and a Doctorate of Veterinary Medicine and Surgery (1987), all at the University of Edinburgh.

Career
Brian Perry has led many international research and development projects seeking a better understanding of the dynamics, control and impacts of tropical diseases of livestock, and the roles of livestock in international development; he has lived and worked in UK, Ethiopia, Colombia, Zambia, USA and Kenya, and has consulted widely in many countries of Africa, Asia and Latin America. He started his international career in Ethiopia on the rinderpest control programme, undertaking surveys of disease of importance to Ethiopia’s livestock sector. He then moved to Colombia, investigating the diseases of impact to the Colombian sheep industry, particularly those affecting smallholder farmers in the Andean region. He then built a veterinary epidemiology field programme in Zambia, investigating the constraints to the traditional livestock sector, before taking up a position at the Virginia–Maryland Regional College of Veterinary Medicine in the USA in 1982, where he initiated the epidemiology teaching and research programme at the Virginia–Maryland Regional College of Veterinary Medicine in the USA in 1982. He went on to lead the epidemiology and socioeconomics research programmes at the International Laboratory for Research on Livestock Diseases (ILRAD) and the International Livestock Research Institute (ILRI) for 20 years, where he specialised in the integration of veterinary epidemiology and agricultural economics to assess the impacts of livestock diseases and their control in low and middle income country settings. Since leaving ILRI in 2007 he has made several analytical contributions on the role of livestock and disease control in pro-poor growth. He recently reviewed the current demands on global livestock research, and the performance of the Consultative Group for International Agricultural Research (CGIAR) in a White Paper. He has led many independent evaluations of public funding investments in agricultural development and health in different countries and regions of the world, including the Real Time Evaluation of the global programme against highly pathogenic avian influenza, run by the Food and Agriculture Organization of the United Nations (FAO).

He chairs the Scientific Advisory Board of Afrique One Aspire, a Wellcome Trust-funded African Research Consortium for Ecosystem and Population Health comprising 11 universities and research institutes. He is an advisor to the Global Alliance for Livestock Veterinary Medicine (GALVmed)-administered AgResults Foot-and-Mouth Disease Vaccine Challenge Project. He sits on the judging panel of the Global Alliance for Livestock Veterinary Medicine (GALVmed)-administered AgResults Brucellosis vaccine prize competition. He is a member of the Management Board of the Medical Research Council (MRC)-funded International Veterinary Vaccinology Network. He is a member of the International Committee of World Horse Welfare.  Brian Perry also contributes to the growth of African-led health research, providing mentorship for younger scientists and support for African capacity-building initiatives; he is chairman of the Scientific Advisory Board of Afrique One, an African Research Consortium for Ecosystem and Population Health, funded by the Wellcome Trust.
He is an author or co-author of some 300 scientific articles in refereed journals, books and proceedings.

Honours
Fellow of the Royal College of Veterinary Surgeons (1995) for meritorious contributions to learning in the field of veterinary epidemiology

Officer of the Order of the British Empire in the 2002 New Year Honours for services to veterinary science in developing countries

International Outstanding Scientist Award (2004) from Consultative Group for International Agricultural Research (CGIAR)

British Veterinary Association Trevor Blackburn Award (2012) for outstanding contributions to animal health and welfare in Africa, Asia and Latin America,

Doctor honoris causa (2015) from the Swedish University of Agricultural Sciences (SLU)

Personal life
He is married to Helena Perry (née Nyberg), and they have two daughters. Brian Perry has engaged in a wide variety of sporting and social activities, including squash, Rugby union in Colombia, windsurfing, flying aeroplanes, horse-racing, three-day eventing, polo, amateur dramatics, playing jazz, cooking, photography and painting. He remains an active polo player, and was Chairman of the Nairobi Polo Club, the Manyatta Polo Club and the Kenya Polo Association and Chief Steward of the Jockey Club of Kenya.

Selected publications
Saville, K., Bambara, C., Marry, A., Perry, B.D. (2020). ‘Invisible livestock’ – On the central roles of working horses, donkeys and mules on the smallholder farms that feed the world  
Warimwe, G.M., Purushotham, J., Perry, B.D. et al. Tackling human and animal health threats through innovative vaccinology in Africa (2018). AAS Open Res 2018, 1:18 (doi: 10.12688/aasopenres.12877.1)
Perry, B., Robinson, T., & Grace, D. (2018). Review: Animal health and sustainable global livestock systems. Animal, 1-10. doi:10.1017/S1751731118000630  
Perry, B. D. (2017). We must tie equine welfare to international development. Debate, Veterinary Record, 181: 600-601, doi: 10.1136/vr.j5561 
Perry, B.D. (2016). The control of East Coast fever of cattle by live parasite vaccination: A science-to-impact narrative. One Health, 2, 103–114. doi:10.1016/j.onehlt.2016.07.002 
Perry, B.D., Grace, D. G. (2015). How Growing Complexity of Consumer Choices and Drivers of Consumption Behaviour Affect Demand for Animal Source Foods. EcoHealth, 12, 703–712.   
Perry, B.D. (2015). Towards a healthier planet: Veterinary epidemiology research at the International Laboratory for Research on Animal Diseases (ILRAD) and the International Livestock Research Institute (ILRI), 1987–2014. Research Report 38. International Livestock Research Institute (ILRI), Nairobi, Kenya.   
Perry, B.D., Morton, J., Stur, W. (2014). A strategic overview of livestock research undertaken by the Consultative Group for International Agricultural Research (CGIAR) Consortium, 64 pp.   Perry, B.D., Grace, D., Sones, K.R. (2011). Current drivers and future directions of global livestock disease dynamics. Proceedings of the National Academy of Sciences www.pnas.org/cgi/doi/10.1073/pnas.1012953108
 Perry, B.D., Romero, J., Lora, E. (2012). Evaluación independiente del Proyecto Regional Integrado para el Control Progresivo de la Fiebre Aftosa en Bolivia, Colombia, Ecuador, Perú y Venezuela GCP/RLA/178/SPA y GTFS/RLA/172/ITA. FAO, Rome. 
 Bett, B., J. Henning, P. Abdu, I. Okike, J. Poole, J. Young, T. F. Randolph and B. D. Perry (2012). Transmission Rate and Reproductive Number of the H5N1 Highly Pathogenic Avian Influenza Virus During the December 2005 – July 2008 Epidemic in Nigeria. 
 Perry, B.D., Bell, L., Gasana, J., Kassa, Yewubdar, Kimoto, Tsukasa, Kumsa, Tesfaye, Tripp, Robert (2011). Independent Evaluation of the Programmes and Cooperation of the Food and Agriculture Organization of the United Nations in Ethiopia, FAO Rome, 89 pp. 
 Perry, B.D. and Grace, D. (2009). The impacts of livestock diseases and their control on growth and development processes that are pro-poor. Philosophical Transactions of the Royal Society, B, 364, 2643 – 2655.
 Perry, B.D. and Rich, K (2007). The poverty impacts of foot and mouth disease and the poverty reduction implications of its control. Veterinary Record, 160, 238–241.
 Perry, B.D. and Sones, K. R. (2007). Poverty reduction through animal health. Science 315, 333–334.
 Perry, B.D. and Sones, K.R. (Editors) (2007). Global Roadmap for Improving the Tools to Control Foot-and-Mouth Disease in Endemic Settings. Report of a workshop held at Agra, India, 29 November −1 December 2006, and subsequent Roadmap outputs. ILRI (International Livestock Research Institute), Nairobi, Kenya, 88 pp. and CD-ROM.
 Perry, B.D., McDermott, J.J. and Randolph, T.F. (2004). Control of infectious diseases: making appropriate decisions in different epidemiological and socio-economic conditions In: Infectious Diseases of Livestock, Volume 1, Editors J.A.W. Coetzer and R.C. Tustin, Oxford University Press, Cape Town, 178–224.
 Perry, B.D., Gleeson, L.J., Khounsey, S., Bounema, P., Blacksell, S. (2002). The dynamics and impact of foot and mouth disease in smallholder farming systems in South East Asia: a case study in the Lao Peoples Democratic Republic. OIE Scientific and Technical Revue, 21, 663–673.
 Perry, B.D., Randolph, T.F., McDermott, J.J., Sones, K.R. and Thornton, P.K. (2002). Investing in Animal Health Research to Alleviate Poverty. International Livestock Research Institute (ILRI), Nairobi, Kenya, 140 pp plus CD-ROM.
 Perry, B.D., McDermott, J.J. and Randolph, T.F. (2001). Can epidemiology and economics make a meaningful contribution to national animal disease control? Preventive Veterinary Medicine, 48, 231–260.
 Perry, B.D., (Editor), (1999). The economics of animal disease control. OIE Scientific and Technical Revue, Special Edition, 18, (2), 561 pp.
 Norval, R.A.I., Perry, B.D. and Young, A.S. (1992). The Epidemiology of Theileriosis in Africa. Academic Press, London, 481 pp.

References

1946 births
Living people
British epidemiologists
British veterinarians
People educated at Town Close School
People educated at Wymondham College
Alumni of the University of Edinburgh
Academics of the University of Edinburgh
Academics of the University of Oxford
Officers of the Order of the British Empire
Fellows of the Royal College of Veterinary Surgeons